Maxim was the Indian edition of the United Kingdom-based international monthly men's magazine called Maxim. It was known for its revealing pictorials featuring popular actresses, singers, and female models, none of which are nudes. The first issue of the Indian edition of Maxim was the January 2006 issue featuring Priyanka Chopra on the cover. The first issue was released on 28 December 2005. The magazine was the first international men's magazine to enter the Indian market and the 30th international version of Maxim. The magazine is no longer published in India.

Largely covering everything related to men's lifestyle, Maxim was the industry leader for men's magazines in India until 2018. Maxim stopped circulating its Indian edition publishing its last issue on 1 December 2018.

Maxim Hot 100
Each year since 2008, the Indian edition of Maxim releases the Maxim Hot 100. The winners and their corresponding ages and the year in which the magazine was released are listed below.

Controversy
The magazine's inaugural issue in January 2006 featured a page called "Women you will never see in Maxim - 100% fake". Among the photos was a full-page morphed photograph showing Khushbu "posing" in black underwear, along with the caption "Of course, I am a virgin if you don't count from the behind." The caption was in reference to remarks made by Kushboo in 2005 whether or not modern men should expect their brides to be virgins. The actress described the photo, which showed only her head, as "immodest". Kushboo filed a petition with Chennai police commissioner R. Nataraj on 30 January 2006, citing two complaints: defamation and the indecent representation of women. The Supreme Court dismissed the case on 22 May 2006.

Editors-in-Chief
The following have served as Editor-in-Chief of Maxim:

References

External links
Maxim India official website

2006 establishments in Haryana
2018 disestablishments in India
Men's magazines published in India
Men's fashion magazines
English-language magazines published in India
Magazines established in 2006
Magazines disestablished in 2018
Monthly magazines published in India